Credit in Heaven is an album released by the American  New wave band The Suburbs, released in 1981.

Reception

Writing for Allmusic, music critic Mark Deming said, "If Credit in Heaven has a flaw, it's that its reach sometimes exceeds its grasp; while none of the songs are bad, some are more immediately memorable than others... an under-appreciated milestone of the Midwestern new wave that awaits rediscovery."

Track listing
All songs composed by The Suburbs.
"Tired of My Plans" – 3:34
"Faith" – 3:53
"Tape Your Wife to the Ceiling" – 3:44
"Macho Drunk" – 4:44
"Ghoul of Goodwill" – 5:44
"Dish It Up" – 6:44
"Mommy" – 7:44
"Cigarette in Backwards" – 8:44
"Girl Ache" – 9:44
"Drinking with an Angel" – 5:28
"Spring Came" – 3:18
"Girlfriend" – 4:53
"Postcard" – 4:11
"Music for Boys" – 6:47
"Idiot Voodoo" – 2:25
"Pipsqueak Millionaire" – 4:04
"Credit in Heaven – 2:57

Personnel
 Chan Poling – keyboards, vocals
 Beej Chaney – Beejtar, vocals
 Hugo Klaers – drums
 Bruce C. Allen – guitar, vocals
 Michael Halliday – bass
 Maggie McPherson – vocals
 Terry Paul – vocals
 Max Ray – saxophone
 Hearn Gadbois – conga

Production notes
Paul Stark – producer, engineer
Doug Sax – digital remastering
Robert Hadley – digital remastering
Laurie Allen – photography

References

External links
  The album page on the Twin/Tone website.

1981 albums
The Suburbs albums
Twin/Tone Records albums